Sethupathi is a 2016 Indian Tamil-language action thriller film written and directed by S. U. Arun Kumar and produced by Shan Sutharsan under the Vansan Movies banner. It stars Vijay Sethupathi and Remya Nambeesan. The film revolves around a police officer whose reputation runs into trouble when a young suspect is severely injured in his custody and threats from his enemies increase.

The film released worldwide on 19 February 2016. The film received positive reviews from critics with praise for Vijay’s performance and the screenplay. The film was remade in Telugu as Jayadev (2016).

Plot
SI Subburaj, who is on night rounds in his C3 Station limits, is lured into a trap and burnt to death by a group of henchmen. Despite being burnt inside his station limits, he stumbles across a small bridge and dies inside C4 Station's limit. This causes tension to the planner of the attack. Sethupathi is the Crime Section's Inspector of C4 Station in Madurai who is awaiting his already-confirmed promotion to ACP. Subburaj's case is given to Sethupathi, who finds out that an influential politician, Vaathiyar of Melur, is behind the murder.

SI Kanagavel is married to Vaathiyar's daughter, but the marriage is an unhappy one. Due to consistent conflict, Vaathiyar tries to make peace between the couple. One day, Vathiyar's daughter comes to his home after being assaulted by Kanagavel. Therefore, Vaathiyar decides to kill Kanagavel. One the eve of the incident, Kanagavel faces an accident and is off-duty due to minor injury. Subburaj, who is attached as Crime SI in the same police station, is filling in for him.

Sethupathi arrests Vaathiyar during a temple festival and forces him to travel to Chennai to apply for bail, earning his enmity. Later, Sethupathi interrogates two adolescent schoolboys who had sold a stolen chain which was lost in a chain-snatching attempt. When they do not speak up, Sethupathi threatens to shoot them on the count of five, albeit using a locked gun. At the fifth count, he accidentally shoots one of the boys in the neck when the other tries to flee, leaving him critically injured. Sethupathi is charged with attempt-to-murder and is suspended.

However, he had no intention of shooting either of the boys and realises someone had unlocked his gun, which he had thought was locked. He soon finds out that Kanagavel is responsible for unlocking his gun. Kanagavel covertly bribes constable Muruganandham in C4 Station to unlock the gun and replace the bullets with dummy ones, so that Sethupathi will be defenseless when attacked by Vaathiyar's men.

Kanagavel assumes that if an inspector (who is investigating brutal murder of an SI) is attacked, the department will retaliate harshly to either kill or to put Vaathiyar in prison for life, so Kanagavel will be not be separated from his daughter. Kanagavel reveals the truth to the City Police Commissioner, and Commissioner tells him to repeat it in the enquiry commission, but the same night, Kanagavel is tied to a long-distance electric pole and burnt alive by Vaathiyar.

Sethupathi and Muruganandham appear before an enquiry of three officials to prove the former's innocence. However, one of the members of the enquiry panel is an ally of Vaathiyar and she tries to influence the panel against Sethupathi. Muruganandham's daughter is kidnapped minutes before the final enquiry, and he turns against Sethupathi. The same evening, the Commissioner and Regional Civil Commissioner visit Muruganandham's home and uncover the truth.

Since these two officers are on the committee, Sethupathi's job is saved. However, Sethupathi's troubles are still not over; Vaathiyar starts targeting Sethupathi and his family. Sethupathi overcomes all the hurdles put by Vaathiyar and his henchmen. Vaathiyar then decides to silence Sethupathi once and for all by sending his henchmen to kill Sethupathi's wife Malarvizhi and two children, but Sethupathi's son, who is aware of the police work, wields Sethupathi's armed revolver to ward them off.

Infuriated with the failed attempt, Vaathiyar instructs his men to kill the schoolboy injured by Sethupathi and put the blame on him. However, Sethupathi, aware of Vaathiyar's plan, guards the hospital where the boy is admitted and saves him from Vaathiyar's henchmen. With Sethupathi returning to work, Vaathiyar's henchmen accept defeat and warn Vaathiyar to leave Madurai for good, but he does not take heed. The next day, Sethupathi kills Vaathiyar by setting his house on fire and closes the case.

Cast

 Vijay Sethupathi as Inspector Kalimuthu Sethupathi, later ACP
 Remya Nambeesan as Malarvizhi
 Vela Ramamoorthy as Vaathiyar
 Vivek Prasanna as Madhivaanan
 Linga as Shenbaga Moorthy
 Master Raghavan as Mara
 TSR as  B. V.  Kumar
 Baby Thanushra
 Muruganandham
 Karuppu Nambiar
 Francis
 Murugan
 Santhanalakshmi

Production
Shooting for the film began in late September 2015 and S. U. Arun Kumar and his team shot the film aiming for a February 2016 release. The entire filming process took place over a single stretch of 50 days, in places such as Chennai, Madurai and Pollachi. The actor plays a law and order inspector and he sported a new look, shedding some weight to look fit and trim.

Soundtrack

The film's soundtrack album and score were composed by Nivas K. Prasanna. Song lyrics were written by Na. Muthukumar. The soundtrack album consist of seven tracks including two instrumentals. The album was released on 20 Jan 2016. The song ""Hey Mama" was reused in the Telugu remake.

Accolades

Critical reception
Vishal Menon of The Hindu said that it was a good thriller and a better family drama. Latha Srinivasan of DNA wrote that there were no loud over-the-top dialogues and punchlines that were typical of all on-screen cops in Tamil films and Vijay Sethupathi outshone many other Kollywood heroes as the cop. IndiaGlitz.com rated the movie 3.5/5 and wrote "You can welcome 'Sethupathi' with open hands for the brilliant performance of Vijay Sethupathi and the gripping screenplay". Malini Mannath of New Indian Express wrote that it is another feather in the cap for Vijay Sethupathi, who reveals his versatility yet again handles his role with remarkable understanding. Anupama Subramaniam of Deccan Chronicle wrote that "Vijay Sethupathi's moves are full of energy and enthusiasm and his impeccable dialogue delivery is a treat to watch."

References

External links

2010s Tamil-language films
Films shot in Madurai
2016 films
Fictional portrayals of the Tamil Nadu Police
2016 action drama films
Indian action drama films
2010s police procedural films
Tamil films remade in other languages
Films scored by Nivas K. Prasanna
Films shot in Pollachi
2016 masala films